Leyla Musalem (born 20 October 1948) is a Chilean former tennis player.

At the 1975 Pan American Games in Mexico City, Musalem won a bronze medal for Chile in the singles competition, finishing behind Lele Forood and Patricia Medrado.

Musalem was a member of Chile's Federation Cup team in 1977 and 1978. Her two ties in 1977 both came against Argentina and she registered two singles wins over Viviana González. In 1978 she helped Chile progress past the first round of the World Group with a win over Uruguay, but lost her singles and doubles matches when they were eliminated in the second round by the Netherlands.

Her husband, Sergio Elías, is president of the Chile Tennis Federation.

In 2019 she was briefly the world's top ranked over 70s player on the ITF Senior's Tour.

References

External links
 
 
 

1948 births
Living people
Chilean female tennis players
Tennis players at the 1975 Pan American Games
Pan American Games medalists in tennis
Pan American Games bronze medalists for Chile
Medalists at the 1975 Pan American Games
20th-century Chilean women